Charleston Parade (Sur un air de Charleston)  is a short 1927 dance comedy film starring Jean Renoir and Johnny Hudgins. It was directed by Jean Renoir. Hudgins performs in blackface. The film is extant.

Renoir used some of the leftover footage from his previous film Nana. It was shot in a few days and unfinished. It deals with racial roles. The film is set in 2028. It is about an explorer.

The film was shown at the Grand Lyon Film Festival in 2018.

References

External links 
 

Films directed by Jean Renoir
1927 films
French comedy short films
French dance films